Malcolm Edwin Moore (born ) is a Namibian rugby union player, currently playing with the Namibia national team and the  in the South African Currie Cup competition. He usually plays as a winger.

Rugby career

Moore was born in Windhoek. He incurred a six month ban from rugby union, effective from July 2013 until January 2014. He made further appearances for Namibia in 2014 and 2016.

References

External links
 

1992 births
Living people
Doping cases in rugby union
Namibia international rugby union players
Namibian rugby union players
Rugby union players from Windhoek
Rugby union wings